Sri Lankan literature is the literary tradition of Sri Lanka. The largest part of Sri Lankan literature was written in the Sinhala language, but there is a considerable number of works in other languages used in Sri Lanka over the millennia (including Pāli, Tamil, and English). However, the languages used in ancient times were very different from the language used in Sri Lanka now.

Up to the present, short stories are a very important part of Sri Lankan literature; the output of Sinhalese short story writers has elicited a greater measure of critical analysis.

List of writers

Sinhala writers

Sinhala poets

Essayists and non-fiction writers

Sinhala playwrights

Sinhala radio play writers

Sri Lankan Tamil authors

Sri Lankan Tamil poets

Neelaavanan

Sri Lankan and Sri Lankan diaspora authors who write in English

See also
 Sri Lankan culture
 Henry Parker, a British engineer who studied and compiled the oral literature of Sri Lanka

References

External links 
All Authors Listed by Country: The South Asian Literary Recordings Project (Library of Congress New Delhi Office)

 
Sri Lankan writers